Leptoderma macrops, the grenadier smooth-head, is a species of slickheads found in the Eastern Atlantic Ocean.  

References

Alepocephalidae
Taxa named by Léon Vaillant
Fish described in 1886